Landau an der Isar (Central Bavarian: Landa an da Isar) is the second-largest town in the Lower Bavarian district, or Landkreis, of Dingolfing-Landau, in the state of Bavaria, Germany. It lies on the river Isar, 120 km downstream from Munich. In 2020, its population was around 14,000.

History
Landau was founded in 1224 by the Wittelsbach Ludwig I, Duke of Bavaria. The town had been a Pflegamt for many years and belonged to the Landshut  of the Electorate-Principality (Kurfürstentum) of Bavaria. Landau possessed a town court with broad magisterial powers (Landgericht).

Until the Bavarian county reform, or Kreisreform in German, in 1972, Landau was the district seat (Kreisstadt) of its own Landkreis, having the license plate code LAN. In the reform, the former townships of Frammering, Mettenhausen, Reichersdorf and Zeholfing, along with parts of the townships of Kammern and Ganacker, were merged with the town of Landau. The incorporation of the townships of Nieder- and Oberhöcking followed in 1978.

Celebrities

Former Landauers
 Manfred Böckl, author
 Uschi Glas, actress
 town pastor Johann Baptist Huber, opponent of the Nazi régime
 Christian Jungwirth, actor and radio DJ
 Norbert Niemann, author
 Amelie Schoenenwald, biologist and European Space Agency reverse astronaut
 Jakob Ziegler, mathematician

Honorary town citizens
 Alois Schlögl (1893–1957), CSU politician, member of the provincial parliament and Provincial Minister for Nutrition, Agriculture and Forestry (1948–1954)
 Arthur Piechler (1896–1974), Cathedral organist in Augsburg und composer
 Hans Kick (1917–2000), 1st Mayor (1966–1984)

Sights to see
 Late Gothic parish church with important winged altar associated with Hans Leinberger in Usterling
 Town museum (Heimatmuseum)
 Town parish church of the Virgin Mary; the parish church of the Assumption of Dormition of the Mother of God (feast day: 15 August) was constructed during the tenure of the town priest Fr. Phillip Rappoldsberger von Dominikus Magazin in 1713. It counts as the largest and most beautiful Baroque church structure in the lower Isar Valley. The church interior shines with the marvellous Baroque high altar and eight side altars.
 Wildthurn Castle (Schloss Wildthurn)
 Kastenhof Landau - The museum für Stone Age and present in the Kastenhof, a historic administarative building
 The "Growing Rock" (Wachsender Felsen) in Usterling
 The Devil's Stairway (Teufelstritt) in Zulling
 The Boulder Church, or Steinfelskirche; the church "At the Thrice-Great Mother in the Rock" originates from the period after the Thirty Years' War and was constructed under Fr. Phillip Rappoldsberger. It houses many votive panels from the 17th and 18th centuries and is counted among the most important pilgrimage churches of the lower Isar Valley.

Economy and infrastructure

Economy: prominent companies
 Brauerei Krieger
 Einhell AG
 Dräxlmaier Group
 IBPmedien GmbH
 Isoflock
 Hefele KG
 Huber GmbH
 Spedition Niedermaier
 vionic Dialog- und Internetmarketing

Traffic/roadways
The town is bound by the Bundesstraße 20 and the Bundesautobahn 92 and lies on the train line Landshut–Wörth a.d.Isar–Dingolfing–Landau a.d.Isar–Wallersdorf–Plattling.

Government offices
 Juvenile Detention Centre
 Ministry for Rural Development
 Forest Ministry
 Ministry of Agriculture
 Surveying Agency

References

External links

  
 Website of the town's Gymnasium
 Landauer Zeitung (local newspaper; available through following link)

Dingolfing-Landau